Telnice may refer to places in the Czech Republic:

 Telnice (Brno-Country District), village and municipality in the South Moravian Region
 Telnice (Ústí nad Labem District), village and municipality in the Ústí nad Labem Region